The 2013 New Brunswick Scotties Tournament of Hearts, the women's provincial curling championship for New Brunswick, was held from January 30 to February 3 at the Tri-County Complex in Fredericton Junction, New Brunswick. The winning team of Andrea Crawford represented New Brunswick at the 2013 Scotties Tournament of Hearts in Kingston, Ontario.

Teams

Round Robin standings
Final Round Robin standings

Round Robin results
All draw times are listed in Atlantic Standard Time (UTC−4).

Draw 1
Wednesday, January 30, 9:00 am

Draw 2
Wednesday, January 30, 4:00 pm

Draw 3
Thursday, January 31, 9:00 am

Draw 4
Thursday, January 31, 4:00 pm

Draw 5
Friday, February 1, 8:00 am

Draw 6
Friday, February 1, 3:00 pm

Draw 7
Saturday, February 2, 8:00 am

Playoffs

Semifinal
Sunday, February 3, 9:00 am

Final
Sunday, February 3, 11:00 am

Qualification round
The qualification round for the 2013 New Brunswick Tournament of Hearts took place from January 4 to 6. The format of play was an open-entry double knockout, qualifying eight teams to the provincial playoffs.

References

External links

New Brunswick
Curling competitions in New Brunswick
Scotties Tournament of Hearts
New Brunswick Scotties Tournament of Hearts
New Brunswick Scotties Tournament of Hearts